In geometry, a truncated cuboctahedral prism or great rhombicuboctahedral prism is a convex uniform polychoron (four-dimensional polytope).

It is one of 18 convex uniform polyhedral prisms created by using uniform prisms to connect pairs of Platonic solids or Archimedean solids in parallel hyperplanes.

Net

Alternative names 
 Truncated-cuboctahedral dyadic prism (Norman W. Johnson) 
 Gircope (Jonathan Bowers: for great rhombicuboctahedral prism/hyperprism) 
 Great rhombicuboctahedral prism/hyperprism

Related polytopes 
It has 76 cells: 2 snub cubes connected by 12 tetrahedrons, 6 square antiprisms, and 8 octahedrons, with 48 tetrahedrons in the alternated gaps. There are 48 vertices, 192 edges, and 220 faces (12 squares, and 16+192 triangles). It has [4,3,2]+ symmetry, order 48.

A construction exists with two uniform snub cubes in snub positions with two edge lengths in a ratio of around 1 : 1.138.

Vertex figure for the omnisnub cubic antiprism

Also related is the bialternatosnub octahedral hosochoron, constructed by removing alternating long rectangles from the octagons, but is also not uniform. It has 40 cells: 2 rhombicuboctahedra (with Th symmetry), 6 rectangular trapezoprisms (topologically equivalent to a cube but with D2d symmetry), 8 octahedra (as triangular antiprisms), 24 triangular prisms (as Cs-symmetry wedges) filling the gaps, and 48 vertices. It has [4,(3,2)+] symmetry, order 48. Its vertex figure is a chiral hexahedron topologically identical to the tetragonal antiwedge.

Vertex figure for the bialternatosnub octahedral hosochoron

External links 
 
 

4-polytopes